Swati Sharma is an Indian singer. She is known for her popular song Banno Tera Swagger from the Tanu Weds Manu: Return, a film directed by Anand L. Rai. She is also notable for producing music that has been used in Bollywood films. In 2017 she became the first Indian singer to perform at the Eiffel Tower (Paris).

Biography 
Sharma was born in Muzaffarpur, Bihar, in northeast India. Her father worked in marketing, while her mother was a homemaker. Sharma's family traces its origin to Sikar in Rajasthan, and this Rajasthani heritage which would inspire some of her later work in the music industry. She started singing at the age of seven, after which her family encouraged her to purse a career in the music industry; her relatives would also jokingly compare her to Sunidhi Chauhan, a prominent playback singer. 

With her father's support, Sharma began her education in music at Pankaj Maharaj, a musical school in Kolkata, before going on to take a music course at Chandigarh University, an institution long associated with Indian music. During this time she also worked as a playback singer, with most of her early work being dubbed over by other musicians or actresses. After she performed a number of devotional hymns before a live audience in Lucknow, she received enough positive feedback to being producing devotional albums.

After finishing her studies, Sharma moved to Mumbai to continue her career in music. She networked extensively, using Facebook to contact musicians for advice and to advocate for her ability to sing. In 2015 she was contacted by Tanishk Bagchi (of the group Tanishk-Vayu), a film score composer who worked extensively in the Bollywood film industry. He commissioned Sharma to sing a romantic song for an upcoming film. The song, Banno tera Swagger, was recorded and later dubbed over by Indian actress Kangana Ranaut in the 2015 romantic comedy film Tanu Weds Manu: Returns. The film was a critical and financial success, and Sharma's role in producing a hit song for Tanu's score led to a dramatic uptick in her popularity.

Sharma has continued to record albums and done more playback work. She won a number of music awards in 2016.

In 2017 she became the first Indian singer to perform at the Eiffel Tower.

Discography

Awards

References 

1994 births
Indian women playback singers
Living people
People from Muzaffarpur
Singers from Bihar
21st-century Indian women singers
21st-century Indian singers